Macropophora trochlearis is a species of beetle in the family Cerambycidae. It was described by Carl Linnaeus in 1758. The species fly from June to August throughout South America.

References

Acanthoderini
Beetles described in 1758
Taxa named by Carl Linnaeus